The Greater and Lesser Forts in Vučak, located in Vučak, Glogovac, Kosovo, constitute an official monument of Kosovo, categorized as “archaeological” under the number 0301-803/88.

History 

Archaeological evidence supports a history of settlement from prehistory to the Middle Ages, but the two prominent forts remaining show characteristics of the Late Antiquity period.

References 

Archaeological sites in Kosovo
Drenica
Drenas